Tornado was a short-lived weekly British comic magazine published for 22 issues by IPC Magazines between March 1979 and August 1979. After the cancellations of the Starlord and Action titles, IPC launched Tornado as a way to use up stories already commissioned for the other titles. Originally to be called Heroes, like Action it was a mixed title featuring war, detective, horror, and science fiction stories. Its first editor was Kelvin Gosnell, who was followed by Dave Hunt. Tornado was printed on the same low quality newsprint stock used by 2000 AD and also had five stories of four to six pages per issue. The title also had a "superpowered" editor, like Tharg, "Big E," who was portrayed in photo-strips by Dave Gibbons.

Stories
Main stories were:

 "The Mind of Wolfie Smith" written by Tom Tully, with art by Vanyo, was the story of a young boy whose telepathic and telekinetic powers suddenly emerge, leading him to become a runaway.
 "Angry Planet"  written by Alan Hebden, with art by Massimo Belardinelli, was set in the late 21st century on a Mars that had been made habitable by humans. The story told of the struggle of the first generation of genetic 'martians' to free themselves from exploitation by Earth.
 "Wagner's Walk" was a World War II story much in the Action style as the hero is an escaped German POW fleeing the Red Army.
 "Blackhawk", written by Gerry Finley-Day with art by Alfonso Azpiri, was the story of a Nubian galley slave named Hawk, who rescues his ship from pirates. Granted his freedom and a commission as a Centurion, Hawk forms his own legion out of other slaves who are then treated as a type of "Dirty Dozen".
 "Victor Drago" was a pseudonymous revival of Sexton Blake, IPC's long-running fearless detective, written by Bill Henry with art by Mike Dorey.
 "The Lawless Touch" was about a thief called Jonny Lawless who is recruited to work for a secret agency.

Publications
As well as 22 regular issues, there were also two Annuals dated 1980 and 1981 (each published at the end of the previous year) and one Summer Special in 1979.

Merger
Tornado was merged with 2000 AD (at the time titled 2000 AD and Starlord, from a previous merger) with the latter's 127th issue. The only characters to transfer were Blackhawk, Wolfie Smith, and Captain Klep, the star of a one-page comedy strip. Both Blackhawk and Wolfie Smith had their storylines considerably modified to more closely fit the sci-fi tone of 2000 AD. Blackhawk was kidnapped by aliens and forced to compete in an outer space gladiators' arena, and the series was taken over by new creators, writer Alan Grant and artist Massimo Belardinelli. Wolfie Smith was menaced by an ancient force under a stone circle. By September 1980, 2000 AD had finished presenting stories with the Tornado characters, and the last issue titled 2000 AD and Tornado was #177, dated 13 September 1980, which contained the last episode of "Wolfie Smith".

Reprints

"Blackhawk" was collected in a trade paperback in 2014. Two more series, "The Lawless Touch" and "Wagner's Walk", were reprinted in the supplements to the Judge Dredd Megazine (#387, 391 and 392) in 2017 and 2018.

Story index

The Angry Planet
Issues: 1–22
Episodes: 22
Pages: 90
Script: Alan Hebden, episodes 1–12, 14, 16–22; Geoffrey Miller 13; unknown 15
Art: Massimo Belardinelli
Cover dates: 24 March 1979 to 18 August 1979

The Mind of Wolfie Smith
Issues: 1–22
Episodes: 22
Pages: 90
Script: Tom Tully 1–11, 15–22; Ken Armstrong 12–14
Art: Vanyo
Dated: 24 March 1979 to 18 August 1979
Note: series continued in 2000 AD #127–134, 136–145, 162–175, 177

Wagner's Walk
Issues: 1–7, 10–19
Episodes: 17
Pages: 68
Script: Pat Mills 1–10, 12–13, 15–17; R. Tufnell 11; M. Wright 14
Art: Lozano 1–7; Mike White 8–17
Dated: 24 March 1979 to 14 July 1979

Victor Drago
The Terror of Troll Island
Issues: 1–7
Episodes: 7
Pages: 36
Script: Bill Henry 1–4, 7; Roy Preston 5–6
Art: Mike Dorey
Dated: 24 March 1979 to 5 May 1979

The Flask of Doom
Issues: 8–10
Episodes: 3
Pages: 6
Script: unknown
Art: unknown
Dated: 12 to 26 May 1979

The Horror of the Mummy's Curse
Issues: 11–13
Episodes: 3
Pages: 6
Script: unknown
Art: unknown
Dated: 2 to 16 June 1979

The China-Town Terror
Issues: 14–16
Episodes: 3
Pages: 10
Script: F. Pepper
Art: Mike Dorey
Dated: 23 June to 7 July 1979

The Killer from Goblin Loch
Issues: 17–19
Episodes: 3
Pages: 6
Script: unknown
Art: unknown
Dated: 14 to 28 July 1979

Scarlip the Gangster
Issues: 20–22
Episodes: 3
Pages: 6
Script: unknown
Art: unknown
Dated: 4 to 18 August 1979

Captain Klep
Issues: 1–7, 9, 12–18, 20, 22
Episodes: 17
Pages: 17
Script: Dave Angus 1–14, 16–17; unknown 15
Art: Kevin O'Neill 1–7, 9–10; Richard Siddall 8; P. Ailey 11, 13, 16–17; J. Henson 12, 14; unknown 15
Dated: 24 March to 18 August 1979
Note: series continued intermittently in 2000 AD #127–159

Tornado's True Tales
The Tale of Benkei
Issues: 1–3
Episodes: 3
Pages: 15
Script: Steve Moore
Art: Musquera
Dated: 24 March to 7 April 1979

Warrior
Issues: 8–10
Episodes: 3
Pages: 9
Script: B. Burrell
Art: John Richardson
Dated: 12 to 26 May to 1979

The Man Behind The Gun
Issues: 20–22
Episodes: 3
Pages: 9
Script: B. Burrell
Art: Pat Wright
Dated: 4 to 18 August 1979

Man Eater
Issues: 22
Episodes: 1
Pages: 5
Script: B. Burrell
Art: John Richardson
Dated: 18 August 1979

Storm
Issues: 3–15, 17–22
Episodes: 19
Pages: 64
Script: Scott Goodall
Art: Musquera 1–5; Cam Kennedy 6–19
Dated: 7 April to 18 August 1979

Black Hawk
Issues: 4–22
Episodes: 19
Pages: 87
Script: Gerry Finley-Day
Art: Alfonso Azpiri
Dated: 14 April to 18 August 1979
Note: series continued in 2000 AD #127–128, 130–161

The Search
Issue: 8
Episodes: 1
Pages: 4
Script: unknown
Art: Massimo Belardinelli
Dated: 12 May 1979

Moon Ghost
Issue: 9
Episodes: 1
Pages: 3
Script: Geoffrey Miller
Art: David Jackson
Dated: 19 May 1979

Big E in Action
The Spy
Issue: 9
Episodes: 1
Pages: 1
Script: unknown
Art: unknown
Dated: 19 May 1979
Note: photo story

The Intruder
Issue: 19
Episodes: 1
Pages: 1
Script: unknown
Art: unknown
Dated: 28 July 1979
Note: photo story

untitled
Issue: 20
Episodes: 1
Pages: 1
Script: unknown
Art: unknown
Dated: 4 August 1979
Note: photo story

The Lawless Touch
Issues: 11–14
Episodes: 4
Pages: 19
Script: Kelvin Gosnell
Art: Barry Mitchell
Dated: 2 to 23 June 1979

The Tornado
Issues: 15–17
Episodes: 3
Pages: 12
Script: R. Tufnell
Art: John Cooper
Dated: 30 June to 14 July 1979

untitled
Issue: 18
Episodes: 1
Pages: 4
Script: Kelvin Gosnell
Art: Barry Mitchell
Dated: 21 July 1979

untitled
Issue: 19
Episodes: 1
Pages: 4
Script: R. Tufnell
Art: John Richardson
Dated: 28 July 1979

The Dogs of Death
Issues: 20–22
Episodes: 3
Pages: 12
Script: Steve MacManus
Art: Mike White
Dated: 4 to 18 August 1979

The Train Now Arriving at No. 14 Acacia Avenue
Issue: 13
Pages: 1
Script: unknown
Art: unknown
Dated: 16 June 1979
Note: text story

Victor Drago's Black Museum of Villains
Al Capone
Issue: 14
Episodes: 1
Pages: 2
Script: unknown
Art: unknown
Dated: 23 June 1979

The Hanging Judge
Issue: 15
Episodes: 1
Pages: 2
Script: unknown
Art: unknown
Dated: 30 June 1979

Billy the Kid
Issue: 16
Episodes: 1
Pages: 2
Script: unknown
Art: unknown
Dated: 7 July 1979

Bonnie and Clyde
Issue: 17
Episodes: 1
Pages: 2
Script: unknown
Art: unknown
Dated: 14 July 1979

Jesse James
Issue: 18
Episodes: 1
Pages: 2
Script: unknown
Art: unknown
Dated: 21 July 1979

Adolf Hitler
Issue: 19
Episodes: 1
Pages: 2
Script: unknown
Art: unknown
Dated: 28 July 1979

Jack the Ripper
Issue: 20
Episodes: 1
Pages: 2
Script: unknown
Art: unknown
Dated: 4 August 1979

Kim Philby
Issue: 21
Episodes: 1
Pages: 2
Script: unknown
Art: unknown
Dated: 11 August 1979

References

Tornado at 2000ad.org

External links
Tornado: Sexton Blake's Last Gasp

1979 comics debuts
Magazines established in 1979
Magazines disestablished in 1979
Comics magazines published in the United Kingdom
Defunct British comics
Fleetway and IPC Comics titles